Stockdale is an unincorporated community in Paw Paw Township, Wabash County and Miami County, in the U.S. state of Indiana.

History
Stockdale was laid out in 1837 by Thomas Goudy. When the Eel River Railroad was built, it was extended to nearby Roann, but not to Stockdale. This led to the decline of Stockdale.

Stockdale Mill was listed on the National Register of Historic Places in 2004.

References

Unincorporated communities in Miami County, Indiana
Unincorporated communities in Wabash County, Indiana
Unincorporated communities in Indiana